"Slight Return"/"The Fountainhead" are songs by The Bluetones, released as their first single, a double A-side, in 1995. They were also included on the band's 2007 compilation The Early Garage Years.

"Slight Return" was reissued the following year as a single from Expecting to Fly. The song is named after the subtitle for "Voodoo Child (Slight Return)" by Jimi Hendrix.

Track listing
7"
"Slight Return"
"The Fountainhead"

The Bluetones songs
1995 singles